Elba is a village in Genesee County, New York, United States. The population was 676 at the 2010 census. The village is named after the island of Elba.

The village of Elba is in the town of Elba. The village is north of Batavia at the intersection of NYS Route 98 and NYS Route 262.

Elba claims to be the "Onion Capital of the World."

Elba hosts its annual "Onion Festival" on the first weekend of August. The festival draws the vast majority of Elba residents as well as people from neighboring towns in Genesee County, and some from all over New York. Among the events are the Fireman's Parade, Kiddie Parade, raffling of a car (usually a new Mustang GT), and the crowning of an "Onion Queen". All profits from the festival go towards the funding of the Elba Fire Department. Although in 2016 the Onion Festival was not held, an Onion Queen was announced at a replacement town event in July.

History 
The site of the village was first settled in 1804, by John Roraback, a weaver. The village of Elba was incorporated in 1884. Previously, in 1882, an attempt to incorporate "Pine Hill" as the town's name led to dissension and a lawsuit. The name "Pine Hill" was derived from a Native American name for the area.

Elba was a stop on the Underground Railroad. There literally was an underground section, as there was a tunnel underneath Main Street between the inn and the home of its owner, Elias Pettibone, which is now collapsed.

Geography
The village is located in northern Genesee County near the center of the town of Elba. New York State Route 98 runs through the village as Main Street, leading north  to Albion and south  to Batavia, the Genesee County seat. New York State Route 262 passes through the southern part of the village, leading east  to Byron and west  to Oakfield.

Demographics

As of the census of 2000, there were 696 people, 245 households, and 190 families residing in the village. The population density was 684.2 people per square mile (263.5/km2). There were 258 housing units at an average density of 253.6 per square mile (97.7/km2). The racial makeup of the village was 96.41% White, 1.44% Black or African American, 0.57% Native American, 0.14% Asian, 1.15% from other races, and 0.29% from two or more races. Hispanic or Latino of any race were 3.30% of the population.

There were 245 households, out of which 38.8% had children under the age of 18 living with them, 63.7% were married couples living together, 9.8% had a female householder with no husband present, and 22.4% were non-families. 20.4% of all households were made up of individuals, and 11.4% had someone living alone who was 65 years of age or older. The average household size was 2.84 and the average family size was 3.28.

In the village, the population was spread out, with 28.3% under the age of 18, 9.6% from 18 to 24, 28.9% from 25 to 44, 20.5% from 45 to 64, and 12.6% who were 65 years of age or older. The median age was 37 years. For every 100 females, there were 102.9 males. For every 100 females age 18 and over, there were 89.0 males.

The median income for a household in the village was $47,614, and the median income for a family was $51,042. Males had a median income of $40,156 versus $30,192 for females. The per capita income for the village was $18,246. About 5.6% of families and 5.7% of the population were below the poverty line, including 6.1% of those under age 18 and none of those age 65 or over.

Notable people
Bill Kauffman, paleoconservative political writer
B. S. Potter, former Wisconsin State Assembly member
Oz Asbjorn, concert promoter, bassist for National recording Metal act Necrostalker

References

External links
 Town and village of Elba official website
 Elba Central School District

Villages in New York (state)
Populated places on the Underground Railroad
Villages in Genesee County, New York